Jules Vince Alpe (born September 24, 1998) is a Filipino figure skater.

Career
Alpe started figure skating at the skating rink at SM Southmall in Las Piñas, Metro Manila. He practices with Michael Christian Martinez whenever Martinez is training in the Philippines. He stopped his schooling in order to focus on his figure skating career.

He was the champion of the Junior Men category of the 2014 Philippine National Figure Skating Championships

At the Elite Junior Men category of the 2016–17 SEA Figure Skating Challenge in Bangkok, Alpe finished first place placing ahead of Chadwick Tse-Fung Wang of Singapore, the only other competitor. He placed second at the Junior Men Category of the 2017 Jégvirág Cup.

Alpes competed at the 2017 Asian Winter Games where he placed 17th in the short program, free skate, and overall.

Programs

Competitive highlights

References

Filipino male single skaters
Figure skaters at the 2017 Asian Winter Games
Asian Games competitors for the Philippines
1998 births
Living people